Buah District is one of four districts located in Grand Kru County, Liberia.

Districts of Liberia
Grand Kru County